Clark V. Fox (born Michael Vinson Clark, November 20, 1946) is an American modernist painter. He currently resides in New York City.

Education 
Clark V. Fox studied art at the Pratt Institute and the Corcoran School of Art.

Artwork 
Fox produced color field paintings while associated with the Washington Color School in the late sixties and simultaneously made figurative pop art. Over the course of his career, Fox consciously alternated between and synthesized these two schools while moving many times between Washington D.C. and New York City. Fox's association with the Washington Color School is reflected in the fact that he was called upon, as a recent graduate of the Corcoran School of Art, to reproduce 50 copies of "Popsicle" by Gene Davis, a leading light of the school, for a highly publicized giveaway in 1969.

Fox's 1968 painting The Three Crosses, which is part of the permanent collection of the Kreeger Museum in Washington, D.C., illustrates this connection with the Washington Color School. Fox is also known for his minimalist architecture paintings, which are held in numerous major museums and private collections, and for his pop representations of Gilbert Stuart’s iconic portrait of George Washington.

Beginning in the seventies, Fox used Mr. Peanut as a vehicle for ironically commenting on consumerist culture and brand-name icons, drawing on the analyses of the Situationist International. "From a pure art standpoint, Clark Fox's monumental painting 'Das Kapital,' with its reverbrating [sic] shadows of green, yellow and blue, is the show's masterpiece", The Houston Chronicle noted with regard to the Situationist-inspired "Corpocracy" exhibit in 2016 at Houston's Station Museum of Contemporary Art. Also in the seventies, Fox focused on paintings of windows, in fact, he "made hundreds of paintings of windows in Washington (where he grew up), in New York (where he studied at the Pratt Institute, and now lives) and in Los Angeles and Paris, where he travels whenever he can."

In 1991, "he founded Clark & Co., a small gallery in Canal Square", in the Georgetown neighborhood of Washington, DC. The gallery eventually "turned nonprofit and became the Museum of Contemporary Art (MOCA), has served as an incubator for local talent, consistently presenting shows that transcend age, gender and race and that challenge the status quo. The work of accomplished talents such as Manon Cleary and Joe Shannon hangs alongside that of such emerging artists as...", noted The Washington Post in 1995.

Museum collections 
Smithsonian American Art Museum, Washington, DC
Birmingham Museum of Art, Birmingham, Alabama
Phoenix Art Museum, Phoenix, Arizona
The Arkansas Art Center, Little Rock, Arkansas
Colorado Springs Fine Arts Center, Colorado Springs, Colorado
Delaware Art Museum, Wilmington, Delaware
Kreeger Museum, Washington, DC
Miami Art Museum,  Miami, Florida
Station Museum of Contemporary Art, Houston, TX
The High Museum of Art , Atlanta, Georgia
Indianapolis Museum of Art, Indianapolis, Indiana
The Speed Art Museum,  Louisville, Kentucky
Montclair Art Museum,  Montclair, New Jersey
Oklahoma City Museum of Art,  Oklahoma City
The Berkeley Springs Art Museum, Berkley Springs, West Virginia

References

1946 births
20th-century American painters
Living people
Painters from New York City
Artists from Washington, D.C.
Corcoran School of the Arts and Design alumni
Pratt Institute alumni
21st-century American painters